Lillete Dubey (born 7 September 1953) is an Indian actress and theatre director. She has worked in Indian and international theatre, television and films in Hindi and English languages. Dubey began her career with Barry John in Delhi and was the founding member of his group - Theatre Action Group in 1973. In 1991 she set up her own theatre company - The Primetime Theatre Company.

Dubey is best known for her acclaimed performances in films like Zubeidaa, Monsoon Wedding (Winner Golden Lion at the Venice Film Festival), Chalte Chalte, Baghban, Kal Ho Naa Ho, My Brother…Nikhil, Delhi in a Day, Bow Barracks Forever (Best Actress Filma Madrid International Film Festival), 3 Days to Go (Best Actress Simon Sabela Awards, KZN South Africa), The Best Exotic Marigold Hotel (BAFTA- Best Ensemble Cast) and The Second Best Exotic Marigold Hotel, and Sonata.

In theatre, she is known for her work like, '30 Days in September', 'Adhe Adhure' (Best Actress Mahindra Excellence in Theatre Awards), 'August - Osage County', Dance Like a Man, 'Where did I Leave my Purdah', and 'Salaam Noni Appa' amongst others.

Early life
Ms Dubey was born in Pune to Sindhi Hindu parents. Her father, Gobind Keswani, was an engineer with the Indian Railways, and her mother, Lila Keswani, was a Gynaecologist from Lady Harding who later worked with the Indian Army.  After Ms Dubey's birth the family moved to Bikaner and later to Lucknow where she studied at Loretto Convent  and then went to Rustom Boarding school in Pune. After Rustoms, she came to Delhi and studied at Carmel Convent. When she was in Class IX, the family moved back to Pune and she joined St. Mary's (Pune), where she first started acting. Her earliest role was that of Cecily in The Importance of Being Earnest. As she was good at academics, her parents were keen on her pursuing Science, however, Ms Dubey wanted to study Arts. After a great deal of persuasion she was allowed to study English literature at Lady Shri Ram College (LSR). It was during this period that she met her husband Ravi Dubey who was doing his M.A in Economics from the Delhi School of Economics. She completed her M.A in English from LSR and her second master's degree in mass communications from IIMC. She married Ravi Dubey on 12 September 1978.

Personal life and family 
Lillete's husband Ravi Dubey was the youngest-ever General Manager of the Taj Mansingh hotel and rose to be the Senior Vice President of Corporate Communications at the Tata Group before he quit in 2004. He died of pancreatic cancer in 2015.

The couple have two daughters, Neha and Ira, both of whom have played a variety of small and supporting roles in theatre, film and television. Additionally, Neha is a psychotherapist with an independent practice in Mumbai.

Lillete is the eldest of three siblings. She has a sister, Lushin, (named after Ilyushin, a Russian aircraft), and a brother, Patanjali , named in honour of the ancient rishi who compiled the Yoga Sutras. He is the founder of the Lemon Tree hotel group. Lushin is the wife of Pradeep Dubey, a noted academic.

Career

Films 
Ms Dubey's entry into films was quite by chance when her husband was posted to Mumbai in 1995, and she has often called herself an 'accidental film actress’. She debuted with the film Love You Hamesha starring Akshaye Khanna and Sonali Bendre in 1999. The movie was directed by Kailash Surendranath. After that, she played a supporting character in Bawandar, directed by Jag Mundhra and starring Nandita Das, in 2000. It was based on the story of a rape victim, Bhanwari Devi, from Rajasthan.
Her career breakthrough was in 2001 when she essayed the role of Aunty Rose in Shyam Benegal's classic Zubeida and won many hearts and next as Shabana, the mother of the female protagonist Sakeena (played by Amisha Patel) in the movie Gadar: Ek Prem Katha. Her second hit, Monsoon Wedding, came out later in the same year and became yet another milestone in her film career. Divya Unny from Open (Indian magazine) said,

"She acted in her first film Zubeidaa (2001) at the age of 47 which would have been considered a late start for an actor. Even as an independent actor, Dubey created a niche. She has defied expectations many times on screen. She was the only actress her age who could carry off smoking a cigarette in a shiny blouse and petticoat, with rollers in her hair, in Monsoon Wedding (2001)."

The following year, in 2002, she again portrayed the role of one of the lead characters’ mother in the movie Om Jai Jagadish, directed by Anupam Kher. Her on-screen daughter was Urmila Matondkar. Another of her memorable roles was that of ‘Shanti Patel’, the wife of Paresh Rawal in Baghban (2003).

The role that gained a lot of attention was that of Jaswinder "Jazz" Kapoor in Kal Ho Naa Ho, in 2003. She played Jazz, an older female character that is fierce, unapologetic, and in touch with her sexuality. In 2004 she played the role of Preity Zinta's reel mother in the movie Lakshya. The film was directed by Farhan Akhtar and starred Hrithik Roshan as the male lead. In the same year, she also worked in Anjan Dutt's Bow Barracks Forever, a film that revolved around the troubles faced by the Anglo-Indian people to keep up their lifestyle, in the post-independence era and which won her the Best Actress award at the Madrid International Film Festival. 

Lillete worked on a long short film  ‘Seasons Greetings’ with Celina Jaitley. Her short film works include Sonata & Purana Pyaar. Her other work includes Qubool hai 2 at Zee5 premium where she plays Nilofer, alongside Karan Singh Grover and Surbhi Jyoti.

Theatre 

Dubey has been acting for over 40 years, and  has played the lead in over 60 productions ranging from Shakespeare, Greek Tragedy, Brecht, Musical Comedies, Farce, Contemporary Drama, Absurd Theatre, to Contemporary Drama, including Ibsen, Tennessee Williams, Arthur Miller, Pinter, Dario Fo, Edward Albee, and Indian playwrights like Vijay Tendulkar, Partap Sharma, Mahesh Dattani, Girish Karnad, Mahesh Elkunchwar. Dubey is also a founder member of the prestigious Delhi based Theatre Action Group.

In 1991, Dubey co-founded The Primetime Theatre Co., with the intention of promoting original Indian writing, and has directed 33 productions for the company so far.

The Prime Time Theatre  Company's productions, directed by Ms Dubey, have traveled widely across India and abroad, with shows at the Bloomsbury Theatre in London, at the Tribecca in New York, at the Portland International Performance Festival in the U.S, as well as in Chicago, San Francisco, Houston, Dallas, Washington DC, Stamford, Raleigh (North Carolina), Los Angeles, Boston and New York in the U.S.

One of Dubey's most notable productions - Dance Like a Man by Mahesh Dattani,  is the longest running Indian play in English, having completed over 650 shows across the world, including a two-week off-Broadway run.

Filmography

Films

Television

Short films and Web series

Nominations and awards 
NOMINATED

 Best Supporting Actress - STAR Screen Awards for the film ‘My Brother Nikhil’ in 2005.

WON

 Best Actress for the film, 'Bow Barracks Forever' at the Madrid International Film Festival, 2008.
 Best Actress for the film “Pankh” at the Dainik Jagran National Film Festival, 2010. 
 Best Actress for her play ‘Adhe Adhure’ at Mahindra Excellence in Theatre awards, 2012.
 Jury Mention for Best Actress for the film ‘3 Days to Go’  at the Global Indian Film Festival 2019. This movie also received 3 more awards for ‘Best Feature Film’,‘Best Screenplay Feature’ and ‘ Best Editing Feature’.  
 Best Actress for the film ‘3 Days to Go’ at the Simon Mabhunu Sabela Film and Television Awards 2019.
 Best Actress for ‘Seasons Greetings’ at the Ayodhya Film Festival, 2020.

References

External links 

1953 births
Living people
Actresses from Pune
Sindhi people
Indian film actresses
Indian stage actresses
Actresses in Hindi cinema
Indian theatre directors
Indian television actresses
21st-century Indian actresses
Indian women theatre directors